BoA is the first US studio album by South Korean pop singer BoA and her twelfth studio album overall. The album was released on March 17, 2009, in the United States. BoA was released in Japan boxed with her second greatest hits album, Best & USA, as a 2-in-1 CD. BoA debuted on the Billboard 200 at #127 and topped the Billboard's Top Heatseekers (Pacific). On August 31, BoA: Deluxe was released digitally via iTunes and includes the single version of "Energetic" and two bonus songs, "Crazy About" and "Control". On September 22, 2009, the album was released worldwide.

Background
In January 2008, it was reported that BoA was planning to enter the US market. However, Lee Soo Man, the head of BoA's label SM Entertainment, denied this, saying there was still more work to do in Asia. On August 29, 2008, SM Entertainment announced it had started a subsidiary label in the U.S., SM Entertainment USA. News reports started to surface once again about BoA breaking into the U.S. market. On September 2, 2008, BoA's label officially announced that she would be entering the US market under their subsidiary label. On September 10, a press conference was held at the Seoul Imperial Palace Hotel to further clarify her plans. With the album, BoA hoped to become a "world-renowned entertainer" in the vein of Janet Jackson.

Production
For the album, BoA worked with well-known music producers such as Bloodshy & Avant, Brian Kennedy and Sean Garrett. The recording of the album took place in Thailand, Australia, Atlanta and Los Angeles. On Space Shower Music Update during her interview, BoA said that the album consisted of upbeat songs and the use of a vocoder. The album was originally titled Look Who's Talking.

Singles 
During her press conference, SM Entertainment announced "Eat You Up" was chosen to be the lead single from the album. The track was produced by Henrik Jonback (who worked with artists such as Britney Spears and Madonna). "Eat You Up" was released online on October 21, 2008. The single charted on the Billboard Hot Dance Club Play chart peaking at the number 8 spot. "Look Who's Talking" was first performed at MTV World Presents: BoA Live in New York on December 3, 2008. BoA also performed the single at the 2008 Jingle Ball, which was held at the Anaheim Honda Center.

"I Did It for Love" was the second official single from the album. A 1:30 snippet of the song was released online on February 17, 2009, on various websites. The track was written and produced by Sean Garrett, who is featured on the single. The single charted on the Billboard Hot Dance Club Play chart peaking at the number 18 spot. On May 30, before their performance at the 2009 MTV Video Music Awards Japan, BoA and Sean Garrett confirmed in an interview that "Energetic" would be the new single. It is another track written and produced by Sean Garrett, therefore continuing their partnership. According to Kenny Wormald, one of BoA's backup dancers, the music video for Energetic was shot between June 3 and 5, 2009. The music video was released online on July 21, 2009, through EW.com. The single charted on the Billboard Hot Dance Club Play chart at number 17.

Promotion and live performances
In order to promote the album, BoA performed at the YouTube Live Tokyo event in November. A taping was held on December 3, 2008, at the MTV studio in Times Square of a live performance titled MTV World Presents: BoA Live in New York. She performed "Eat You Up", "Look Who's Talking" and the title song of her fifth Korean studio album, Girls on Top. BoA also performed at the 2008 Jingle Ball, as an opening act. She also promoted in South Korea at the 2008 SBS Gayo Daejun. BoA herself told EW.com that she has a "repackaged album [to be] released in September", with the new songs "Control" produced by Brian Kennedy and "Crazy About", produced by Sean Garrett.

Track listing

BoA: Deluxe bonus tracks

Notes
The bonus tracks are at the beginning. Tracks 4-14 are the original album, with the original version of "Energetic" moved to track 14.
1 Remake of Buddha's delight by Haley Bennett from the soundtrack Music and Lyrics: Music from the Motion Picture.
2 Cover of the 2007 B-side by German girl group Monrose.
3 English self-cover of the song with the same name from her fifth Korean studio album (2005).

Personnel
Tom Coyne (Sterling Sound) – audio mastering (Deluxe version)
Hoon Jeon (Sonic Korea) – audio mastering

Charts and sales

Weekly charts

Sales

Release history

References

External links
 BoA's official U.S. website

2009 albums
Albums produced by Brian Kennedy (record producer)
Albums produced by Bloodshy & Avant
Albums produced by Sean Garrett
BoA albums
SM Entertainment albums